Central Institute for Cotton Research (CICR), is a central research institute established in 1976 by the Indian Council of Agricultural Research to promote long term research efforts in cotton production and provide support and conduct applied research on cotton with the active involvement of State Universities.The research institute has two campuses one in Nagpur Maharashtra and the other in Sirsa Haryana. The research efforts of CICR fall under the All India Coordinated Cotton Improvement Project (AICCIP), initiated by the Council in 1967.
Its headquarters are located in Nagpur and the other two regional units are located at Coimbatore, Tamil Nadu and Sirsa, Haryana.

Campuses
CIRS has two campus at Nagpur in Maharashtra and Sirsa in Haryana.

Nagpur Campus
Central Institute for Cotton Research, Nagpur ('CICR, Nagpur or CICRN) in collaboration with the Government of Maharashtra, implemented a pilot project in the Vidarbha region (highly prone to farmer suicides), based on a Brazilian model to enhance the per-acre yield of cotton while reducing its per-acre cultivation cost. The Brazilian model is based on straight cotton crops while Indian government's model promotes the use of Bt cotton crops.

Sirsa Campus
Central Institute for Cotton Research, Sirsa ('CICR, Sirsa or CICRS) was established at Sirsa city in collaboration with the Government of Haryana. It is located across the Chaudhary Devi Lal University on NH9.

See also
 List of think tanks in India
 Central Cotton Research Institute, Multan (Pakistan)

References

External links
 Times of India covering CICR's development of its own bt cotton varieties

Indian Council of Agricultural Research
Research institutes in Haryana
Research institutes in Nagpur
Research institutes established in 1976
Cotton organizations
Sirsa, Haryana
Agricultural research institutes in India
Cotton industry in India
1976 establishments in Maharashtra